St. Helena is a city in Napa County, California, United States. Located in the North Bay region of the San Francisco Bay Area, the population was 5,814 at the 2010 census.

St. Helena is a popular tourist destination, owing to its vineyards and culinary scene. The city is the center of St. Helena American Viticultural Area (AVA), which expands  of the Napa Valley with over 400 vineyards encompassing  of cultivation. St. Helena is the location of The Culinary Institute of America at Greystone and a campus of Napa Valley College.

History

St. Helena was first inhabited by a native American group known as the Wappo people. They spoke Yukian and are believed to have first settled in St. Helena as early as 2000 B.C. The Wappo name for the area is Anakotanoma, meaning .

The area was likely named after a nearby mountain known as Mount St. Helena.
 
The locale became renown when White Sulphur Springs was discovered in 1848 and established an operating resort in 1852. During the later 19th century, affluent San Franciscans traveled here by steamer across the Bay, and then four miles by stage and later by train. At its prime, California's oldest resort was able to accommodate 1000 guests in its grand hotels which were later lost to local wildfires. The site is recognized as a National Historic Landmark.

The town of St. Helena was founded by Henry Still, who bought land from the Edward Bale family in 1855. By 1858 there was a school house and a little Baptist church. Four years later Professor William Brewer of the Whitney party called it a "pretty little village with fifty or more houses . . .nestled among grand old oaks." It officially became a town on March 24, 1876, and by 1886 the population grew to 1,800 inhabitants. Shortly after in 1868, the first railroad was created in St. Helena allowing for shipment of resources such as fruit and mining products. The newly built train tracks also brought in tourists.

Ellen White, co-founder of the Seventh-day Adventist Church, had a home called Elmshaven near St. Helena, beginning in 1900. She died there in 1915, and the site is now a National Historic Landmark. Both the Beringer Vineyards and the Charles Krug Winery are California Historical Landmarks.

St. Helena's community center was built as a Carnegie library; it served as the city library from 1908 to 1978.

Geography

Climate

The National Weather Service has a cooperative weather station in St. Helena. Winters are cool and wet, while summers have hot days and cool nights with little precipitation. There are an average of 54.6 days with highs of 90 °F (32 °C) or higher and an average of 13.8 days with lows of 32 °F (0 °C) or lower.

There are an average of 68 days with measurable precipitation.

Demographics

The 2010 United States Census reported that St. Helena had a population of 5,814. The racial makeup of St. Helena was 4,525 (77.8%) White, 25 (0.4%) African American, 35 (0.6%) Native American, 98 (1.7%) Asian, 9 (0.2%) Pacific Islander, 978 (16.8%) from other races, and 144 (2.5%) from two or more races. Hispanic or Latino of any race were 1,914 persons (32.9%).

The Census reported that 98.3% of the population lived in households and 1.7% lived in non-institutionalized group quarters.

There were 2,401 households, out of which 694 (28.9%) had children under the age of 18 living in them, 1,118 (46.6%) were opposite-sex married couples living together, 223 (9.3%) had a female householder with no husband present, 99 (4.1%) had a male householder with no wife present. There were 96 (4.0%) unmarried opposite-sex partnerships, and 20 (0.8%) same-sex married couples or partnerships. 805 households (33.5%) were made up of individuals, and 411 (17.1%) had someone living alone who was 65 years of age or older. The average household size was 2.38. There were 1,440 families (60.0% of all households); the average family size was 3.03.

The population was spread out, with 1,280 people (22.0%) under the age of 18, 453 people (7.8%) aged 18 to 24, 1,333 people (22.9%) aged 25 to 44, 1,627 people (28.0%) aged 45 to 64, and 1,121 people (19.3%) who were 65 years of age or older. The median age was 42.9 years. For every 100 females, there were 88.2 males. For every 100 females age 18 and over, there were 84.9 males.

The homeowner vacancy rate was 2.7%; the rental vacancy rate was 5.8%. 51.4% of the population lived in owner-occupied housing units and 46.9% lived in rental housing units.

Economy
Major employers in St. Helena include Trinchero Family Estates, Beringer Vineyards, and The Culinary Institute of America. The city is distinct in its regulation against chain restaurants; only one exists in the city - an A&W - established before the legislation was enacted. The St. Helena AVA was designated in 1995 for the valley region surrounding the town. Duckhorn Vineyards, Newton Vineyard, Charles Krug Winery, Brown Estate and numerous other vineyards and wineries exist near St. Helena. Adventist Health St. Helena is located in neighboring Deer Park, California.

Government
St. Helena is a general law city which lacks its own charter. It operates under a council–manager form of government.

Education

Saint Helena Unified School District is the local school district. St. Helena High School serves students in grades 9-12. Saint Helena Primary school teaches grades kindergarten through second grade.
Saint Helena Elementary School teaches grades three through five  It is ranked #2 best public school in the Napa Valley 

Robert Louis Stevenson Middle School teaches grades six through eight  Robert Louis Stevenson Middle School is ranked #1 best public middle school in the Napa Valley and has a teacher to student ratio of 13:1. Saint Helena High School teaches grades nine through twelve Saint Helena High School is ranked #1 best public school in the Napa Valley.

The city has two tertiary campuses, one is the Upper Valley Campus of Napa Valley College; the other is The Culinary Institute of America at Greystone, a branch campus of the main institution in Hyde Park, New York.

Notable people

 Peter Newton, winemaker 
 David Duncan, vintner 
 Charles Krug, winemaker 
 Josephine Tychson, the first woman to build and operate a winery in the U.S. state of California
 Michela Alioto-Pier, a former member of the San Francisco Board of Supervisors
 Wayne Belardi, MLB player
 Fred Hofmann, MLB player
 Don Mossi, MLB player
 Billy Orr, MLB player
 M. F. K. Fisher, food writer
 William Hamilton, cartoonist and playwright
 Siegfried Horn, archaeologist and Biblical scholar
 William B. Hurlbut, born in St. Helena, raised in NY, professor at Stanford University Medical Center.
 Bob Marshall, CA politician
 Fritz Maytag, businessman
 Donald C. McRuer, congressman 
 Charles O'Rear, photographer
 Carl Osburn, Naval officer and sports shooter
 Frank K. Richardson, associate justice of the California Supreme court
 Dave Smith, an engineer and musician
 Edwin R. Thiele, a missionary, writer and archaeologist
 Owen Wade, politician
 Ellen G. White, author and pioneer.

In popular culture
One of Disney's classic movies "Pollyanna" was filmed on Railroad Avenune in Saint Helena in 1960.
The Elvis Presley 1961 release, "Wild in the Country", was filmed in a small Saint Helena house now known as a popular inn called The Ink House.
"A Walk in the Clouds" (1995) was filmed in northern Saint Helena. The movie depicts a love story involving a daughter of a vineyard owner.
"Patch Adams" (1989) starring Robin Williams had a scene filmed at the picturesque cemetery in St. Helena.
The "When Death Comes Calling" episode (S6.E2, 2013) of My Ghost Story was filmed at a winery in the city.

See also
 List of cities and towns in California
 List of cities and towns in the San Francisco Bay Area
 Tree City USA

References

External links

 
 St. Helena Chamber of Commerce
 St. Helena Historical Society

 
Cities in Napa County, California
Napa Valley
Cities in the San Francisco Bay Area
Incorporated cities and towns in California
1876 establishments in California
Populated places established in 1876